Eustache Cuicci (1908-1980) was a French politician. He served as a member of the National Assembly from 1956 to 1958, representing Deux-Sèvres.

References

1908 births
1980 deaths
People from Annaba
People of French Algeria
Pieds-Noirs
Union for the Defense of Tradesmen and Artisans politicians
Deputies of the 3rd National Assembly of the French Fourth Republic